Siah Khaleh Sar (also Romanized as Sīāh Khāleh Sar; also known as Sīāhālsar, Sīāh Khāleh, and Siakhalsar) is a village in Chahar Farizeh Rural District, in the Central District of Bandar-e Anzali County, Gilan Province, Iran. At the 2006 census, its population was 508, in 165 families.

References 

Populated places in Bandar-e Anzali County